The Democracy and Peace Party (abbreviated DPP; formerly the League for Democracy and Peace) is a Burmese political party registered in May 2010, with headquarters in Pabedan Township, Yangon. It is contesting the 2010 general election in Burma. DPP's chairman is Aung Than, a high court attorney and a member of the League for Democracy and Peace, a political party founded by former Prime Minister U Nu in 1988. On 28 August 1988, at the peak for pre-democracy movement in Burma,  U Nu, with his colleagues who were mostly former members of democratically elected government which was forcefully dissolved by the coup d'état of Ne Win, formed the League for Democracy and Peace (LDP). LDP contested the 1990 election but did not win any seats and was subsequently deregistered.

References

External links
 Political parties - Myanmar at Encyclopedia of the Nations

Political parties established in 2010
Political parties in Myanmar
Burmese democracy movements
2010 establishments in Myanmar